The Western Canada Junior Hockey League was a junior ice hockey based in Alberta and Saskatchewan from 1948 until 1956. It was formed by teams which sought a higher level of competition and more formal organization. Its teams were eligible for the Memorial Cup as the national junior champion of the Canadian Amateur Hockey Association, and were runners-up in five seasons as the Abbott Cup junior champion of Western Canada.

History
The Western Canada Junior Hockey League (WCJHL) formed in 1948 after junior ice hockey teams from Alberta and Saskatchewan wanted to form a league with a higher level of competition with more formal organization by a dedicated league governor rather than a provincial governing body. All four teams from the Southern Alberta Junior Hockey League combined with two teams from the Saskatchewan Junior Hockey League to become a six-team league. The remaining junior teams in Saskatchewan reorganized as the South Saskatchewan Junior Hockey League for the 1948–49 season. Earlier in 1948, the stronger junior teams based in Saskatchewan and Manitoba proposed an inter-provincial league. Manitoba Amateur Hockey Association president Jimmy Dunn was opposed to the idea since he felt it would have a negative effect on junior hockey in Winnipeg.

The WCJHL operated under the joint jurisdiction of the Alberta Amateur Hockey Association and the Saskatchewan Amateur Hockey Association, and participated in the playoffs for the Memorial Cup as organized by the Canadian Amateur Hockey Association (CAHA). Teams from the WCJHL won the Abbott Cup as the junior champions of Western Canada in five seasons, which included the Regina Pats in 1950, 1952, 1955, 1956, and the Edmonton Oil Kings in 1954. In each of these seasons, the WCJHL team was a runner-up to the Eastern Canada champion which won the Memorial Cup final as the national junior champion. 

The WCJHL and other junior teams in Western Canada addressed the imbalance in Memorial Cup competition in a meeting with CAHA president W. B. George in August 1954. The teams sought permission for any league champion to add three players in the inter-provincial playoffs for the Memorial Cup, and contended that the imbalance in competition caused lack of spectator interest and less prestige for the event. At the next CAHA meeting in January 1955, the request for three additional players for the Abbott Cup representative was approved.

The WCJHL folded in 1958 and three of the remaining four teams returned to their respective provincial junior leagues. The exception was the Edmonton Oil Kings, which joined the Central Alberta Hockey League, a senior ice hockey league.

Governors
List of league governors:

Red Dutton (1948 to 1951)
Al Pickard (1951 to 1953)
Ken Doraty (1953 to 1956)

Teams
List of teams that played in the WCJHL:

Standings

1948–49 season

Source:

1949–50 season

Source:

1950–51 season

Source:

1951–52 season

Source:

1952–53 season

Source:

1953–54 season

Source:

1954–55 season

Source:

1955–56 season

Source:

References

1948 establishments in Canada
1956 disestablishments in Canada
Sports leagues established in 1948
Sports leagues disestablished in 1956
Defunct junior ice hockey leagues in Canada
Defunct ice hockey leagues in Alberta
Defunct ice hockey leagues in Saskatchewan